is a Japanese light novel series, written by Natsume Akatsuki and illustrated by Kakao Lanthanum. Originally serialized as a web novel in Shōsetsuka ni Narō between August 2012 and September 2012, Kadokawa Shoten have published the series since November 2017 under their Kadokawa Sneaker Bunko imprint. A manga adaptation with art by Masaaki Kiasa has been serialized in Media Factory's seinen manga magazine Monthly Comic Alive since March 2018. Both the light novel and the manga are licensed in North America by Yen Press. An anime television series adaptation produced by J.C.Staff aired from April to June 2021.

Plot
Having almost completed their conquest of Earth, the evil Kisaragi Corporation has decided to expand their operations to other Earth-like planets across the universe by sending Combat Agent 6 and newly developed combat droid Alice to a fantasy-like world via an untested teleporter. Shortly after arriving, 6 and Alice find themselves drafted into the Kingdom of Grace's military. However, 6 has to collect enough "Evil Points" to help Kisaragi establish a foothold on this new planet. 6 and Alice must balance their work for Kisaragi with saving the Kingdom of Grace and its Princess from the encroaching demon army.

Characters

One of the first combat agents for the Kisaragi Corporation whose real name has not been revealed. 6 serves as an advance scout for Kisaragi on the other world (chosen by dice roll), and constantly gets himself into dishonorable or lecherous situations to increase his Evil Points, but his underhanded tactics are useful in fighting against demonic opponents he encounters. He knows the Supreme Leaders of Kisaragi from their shared past. 

The "Kisaragi Company Pretty Girl Android," Alice is a combat droid recently built by Lilith who claims to have the strength of a little girl, but she is able to wield a pump shotgun that 6 summons for her early on. Alice also claims to have a powerful self-destruct device embedded inside her that will trigger with enough damage. She often serves as the "straight man" to 6's antics.

The ambitious Commander of Princess Tillis' Royal Guard who clawed her way up from the slums, primarily motivated by fortune and glory. After an incident with bringing 6 and Alice into the Kingdom, Snow is demoted and forced to serve as 6's Executive Officer. Snow has a habit of blowing her money on expensive swords with fancy names.

A chimera in the form of a little girl, she can copy the abilities of any creature she eats. Rose treats the words of her late creator as gospel, which leads to her saying some "tacky" lines at times.

An Archbishop of Zenarith and a slut with an awful personality (according to 6) who often falls asleep during battle. She is a dark mage, capable of inflicting curses upon her targets. However, her curses only work "maybe 80% of the time," and "the success rate drops like a rock" when she uses the same phrasing or might even affect her instead. Grimm is bound to a wheelchair, but only because a backfired curse made her unable to wear shoes. Being an Archbishop of Zenarith allows Grimm to be resurrected from death when an offering is made at a nearby shrine or temple.

One of the Supreme Leaders of Kisaragi, who has the power to encase her enemies in ice. She secretly has a crush on 6.

One of the Supreme Leaders of Kisaragi with the power to create flames from her hands. Is easily embarrassed when reminded of her family. 6 accidentally revealed that her real name is Yukari.

One of the Supreme Leaders of Kisaragi, a small girl who designs and builds high-tech devices of all kinds.
 / 

The princess and current ruler of the Kingdom of Grace whose royal family mysteriously disappeared.

A member of the Four Heavenly Kings of the Demon Army, also known as "Heine of the Flame" which she controls power over fire.

The former ruler of the Grace Kingdom who mysteriously disappeared and a father to Princess Tillis.

Media

Light novels
The first light novel volume was published on November 1, 2017 by Kadokawa Shoten under their Kadokawa Sneaker Bunko imprint. As of June 2022, seven volumes have been published. The light novel series is published in North America by Yen Press.

Manga
A manga adaptation illustrated by Masaaki Kiasa began serialization in Media Factory's Monthly Comic Alive manga magazine on March 27, 2018. The series has been collected in eight tankōbon volumes. The manga series is also published in North America by Yen Press.

Anime
During a livestream commemorating the first year anniversary of Kadokawa's "Kimirano" light novel website on March 15, 2020, it was announced that the series would receive an anime television series adaptation. The series was animated by J.C.Staff and aired from April 4 to June 20, 2021 on AT-X, Tokyo MX, KBS Kyoto, SUN, and BS-NTV. Hiroaki Akagi directed the series, with Yukie Sugawara handling the series' scripts, Sōta Suwa designing the characters, and Masato Kōda composing the series' music. Miku Itō performed the opening theme "No.6," while Miyu Tomita, Sayaka Kikuchi, Natsumi Murakami, and Minami Takahashi performed the ending theme "Home Sweet Home" as their respective characters. It ran for 12 episodes.

Funimation co-produced the series and streamed it on its website in North America and the British Isles, in Europe through Wakanim, and in Australia and New Zealand through AnimeLab. Following Sony's acquisition of Crunchyroll, the series was moved to Crunchyroll. Muse Communication has licensed the series in Southeast Asia and South Asia, and streamed it on their Muse Asia YouTube channel and Bilibili.

Episode list

Notes

References

External links
 
 
 
Anime official Twitter 

2017 Japanese novels
2021 anime television series debuts
Anime and manga based on light novels
AT-X (TV network) original programming
Crunchyroll anime
J.C.Staff
Kadokawa Dwango franchises
Kadokawa Sneaker Bunko
Light novels
Light novels first published online
Media Factory manga
Muse Communication
Seinen manga
Shōsetsuka ni Narō
Yen Press titles